Mamatkul Uchuko uulu, better known as Mamatkul Biy (1660 – 1758) was the Unified Biy of the northern Kyrgyz and one of the leaders of the people's struggle against the Dzungar Khanate.

Background 
In the 80s of the 17th century, the Kyrgyz tribes were ruled by Kudayan Khan. Being a close relative of the khan, Mamatkul Biy competed with him for power, and later acted as one of the contenders for the position of the monarch. In the 1680s – early 1690s, unable to resist the Dzungar invaders, the Kyrgyz of the north migrated to the regions of the Ferghana Valley and, under the leadership of Kudayan Khan, penetrated the Issyk-Kul basin. According to historical information, Kudayan Khan died in Khujand. After that, Mamatkul Biy, having united the Kyrgyz who came to Ferghana, settled them in the upper reaches of Namangan.

Mamatkul Biy, as a representative of the  tribe, was elected the Supreme Biy of all the Kyrgyz tribes of the north, and Koshoi Biy (Solto),  (Kytai), Maitak Biy (Kushchu) and Akbay Biy (Saruu) were personal advisers.

Kyrgyz-Dzungarian War 

In the middle of 1680, unable to withstand the Dzungar invasion, the Kyrgyz tribes were pushed back to Fergana and to the Hissar Range.

Since 1720, Mamatkul Biy began to lead the people's struggle against the Dzungars. The main group of Kyrgyz tribes returned to the Ketmen-Tobe valley.

The struggle of the Kyrgyz against the violence of the Dzhungar Khanate intensified especially in the 18th century. Taking advantage of the political situation in the Dzhungar Khanate, at the beginning of the 18th century. Kyrgyz and Kazakhs begin a joint struggle against him. The allies inflict several sensitive blows on the Dzhungaria at war and with the Qing Empire. But the loss of livestock and famine that occurred in 1722-1723 made it difficult for the Kyrgyz and Kazakhs to continue successful military operations. In 1728, the Dzhungars, led by the son of Tsewang Rabtan, Shuna Laba, invaded the Kyrgyz and Kazakhs with an army of 60 thousand people, exposing the local population to genocide. This period in the oral history of the Kyrgyz and Kazakhs is called "the time of the great curse."

In the early 1750s, the Kyrgyz tribes, led by Mamatkul Biy and military figures: Koshoi biy, Atake Batyr, Kachike Batyr,  and others, defeated the main Dzungar forces concentrated in Talas Valley, Chüy Valley, Sokuluk and Ak-Beshim. They liberated the Kyrgyz lands from Issyk-Kul to the left bank of the Ili River. As a result of these victories, in 1755-1756, the Kyrgyz tribes again occupied the modern lands of the Chüy, Naryn, Talas and Issyk-Kul regions.

From the 50s of the 18th century, the Kyrgyz fought against the Dzhungars outside of Kyrgyzstan - on the territory of East Turkestan. During these years, an internal struggle for power flared up in the Dzhungar Khanate itself, and after the death of Tsewang Dorji Namjal, his heirs begin an internecine war. The Qing Empire cleverly took advantage of this moment, in 1755 capturing the territory of the khanate. In 1758 the Dzhungar Khanate was completely destroyed. Countless ordinary Oirot people perish at the hands of the invader warriors of the Qing Empire.

After the fall of the Dzungar state, Chinese emissaries who were persuading the Kyrgyz to come under the jurisdiction of the Qing dynasty, met with Mamatkul at Issyk-Kul.

Foreign policy 

In 1758, in connection with the arrival of Chinese ambassadors, in order to clarify the borders of the Qing state, Mamatkul Biy sent his embassy of 7 people to China: Cherikchi Biy (head of the embassy), Sherbek Batyr, Tülkü Biy, Nyshaa Batyr, Akbay Batyr, Notsi Biy and Shükür Biy. The delegates in the same year were at the reception of the Qing Emperor Qianlong and resolved political and border issues. They demanded the return of the occupied lands and the Emperor promised to look into these issues. But even before these demands were met, the Kyrgyz themselves completely liberated their lands by force.

See also 

 Atake Tynay Biy Uulu

References 

1660 births
1758 deaths

Turkic rulers